Caylee Marie Anthony (August 9, 2005 – June–December 2008) was an American girl who lived in Orlando, Florida, with her mother, Casey Marie Anthony (born March 19, 1986), and her maternal grandparents, George and Cindy Anthony. On July 15, 2008, she was reported missing in a  call made by Cindy, who said she had not seen Caylee for 31 days and that Casey's car smelled like a dead body had been inside it. Cindy said Casey had given varied explanations as to Caylee's whereabouts before finally telling her that she had not seen Caylee for weeks. Casey lied to detectives, telling them Caylee had been kidnapped by a nanny on June 9, and that she had been trying to find her, too frightened to alert the authorities. She was charged with first-degree murder in October 2008 and pled not guilty.

On December 11, 2008, two-year-old Caylee's skeletal remains were found with a blanket inside a laundry bag in a wooded area near the Anthony family's house. Investigative reports and trial testimony varied between duct tape being found near the front of the skull and on the mouth of the skull. The medical examiner mentioned duct tape as one reason she determined the death was a homicide, while the cause of death was listed as "death by undetermined means".

The trial lasted six weeks, from May to July 2011. The prosecution sought the death penalty and alleged Casey wished to free herself from parental responsibilities and murdered her daughter by administering chloroform and applying duct tape to her nose and mouth. The defense team, led by Jose Baez, countered that the child had drowned accidentally in the family's swimming pool on June 16, 2008, and that George Anthony disposed of the body. The defense contended that Casey lied about this and other issues because of a dysfunctional upbringing, which they said included sexual abuse by her father. The defense did not present evidence as to how Caylee died, nor evidence that Casey was sexually abused as a child, but challenged every piece of the prosecution's evidence, calling much of it "fantasy forensics". Casey did not testify. On July 5, 2011, the jury found Casey not guilty of first-degree murder, aggravated child abuse, and aggravated manslaughter of a child, but guilty of four misdemeanor counts of providing false information to a law enforcement officer. With credit for time served, she was released on July 17, 2011. A Florida appellate court overturned two of the misdemeanor convictions on January 25, 2013.

The not-guilty murder verdict was met with public outrage and was both attacked and defended by media and legal commentators. Some complained the jury misunderstood the meaning of reasonable doubt, while others said the prosecution relied too heavily on the defendant's alleged poor moral character since they had been unable to show conclusively how the victim had died. Time magazine described the case as "the social media trial of the century".

Disappearance
According to Casey Anthony's father, George Anthony, Casey left the family's home on June 16, 2008, taking her daughter Caylee (who was almost three years old) with her, and did not return for 31 days. Casey's mother Cindy asked repeatedly during the month to see Caylee, but Casey claimed that she was too busy with a work assignment in Tampa, Florida. At other times, she said Caylee was with a nanny, who Casey identified by the name of Zenaida "Zanny" Fernandez-Gonzalez, or at theme parks or the beach. It was eventually determined that a woman named Zenaida Fernandez-Gonzalez did in fact exist, but that she had never met Casey, Caylee, any other member of the Anthony family, nor any of Casey's friends.

Learning that Casey's car was in a tow yard, George Anthony went to recover it; he and the yard attendant noted a strong smell coming from the trunk. Both later stated that they believed the odor to be that of a decomposing body. When the trunk was opened, it contained only a bag of trash.

Cindy reported Caylee missing that day, July 15, to the Orange County Sheriff's Office. During the same telephone call, Casey confirmed to the 9-1-1 operator that Caylee had been missing for 31 days. Sounding distraught, Cindy said: "There is something wrong. I found my daughter's car today and it smells like there's been a dead body in the damn car."

Case

Investigation

When Detective Yuri Melich of the Orange County Sheriff's Department began investigating Caylee's disappearance, he found discrepancies in Casey's signed statement. When questioned, Casey said Caylee had been kidnapped by Zenaida Fernandez-Gonzalez, whom she also identified as "Zanny", Caylee's nanny. Although Casey had talked about her, Zanny had never been seen by Casey's family or friends, and in fact there was no nanny. Casey also told police that she was working at Universal Studios, a lie she had been telling her parents for years. Investigators took Casey to Universal Studios on July 16, 2008, the day after Caylee was reported missing, and asked her to show them her office. Casey led detectives around the building for around 25 minutes before she stopped, started smiling and jokingly admitted that she had no office there and that she had been fired years before.

Casey was first arrested on July 16, 2008, and was charged the following day with giving false statements to law enforcement, child neglect, and obstruction of a criminal investigation. The judge denied bail, saying Casey had shown "woeful disregard for the welfare of her child". On July 22, 2008, after a bond hearing, the judge set bail at $500,000. On August 21, 2008, after one month of incarceration, she was released from the Orange County jail after her $500,000 bond was posted by the nephew of California bail bondsman Leonard Padilla in hopes that she would cooperate and Caylee would be found.

On August 11, 12 and 13, 2008, meter reader Roy Kronk called police about a suspicious object found in a forested area near the Anthony residence. In the first instance, he was directed by the sheriff's office to call the tip line, which he did, receiving no return call. On the second instance, he again called the sheriff's office, and eventually was met by two police officers. He reported to them that he had seen what appeared to be a skull near a gray bag. On that occasion, the officer conducted a short search and stated he did not see anything. On December 11, 2008, Kronk again called the police. They searched and found the remains of a child in a trash bag. Investigative teams recovered duct tape which was hanging from hair attached to the skull and some tissue left on the skull. Over the next four days, more bones were found in the wooded area near the spot where the remains initially had been discovered. On December 19, 2008, medical examiner Jan Garavaglia confirmed that the remains found were those of Caylee Anthony. The death was ruled a homicide and the cause of death listed as undetermined.

Arrests and charges

Casey was offered a limited immunity deal on July 29, 2008, by prosecutors related to "the false statements given to law enforcement about locating her child", which was renewed on August 25, to expire August 28. She did not take it. On September 5, 2008, she was released again on bail for all pending charges after being fitted with an electronic tracking device. Her $500,000 bond was posted by her parents, Cindy and George Anthony, who signed a promissory note for the bond.

On October 14, 2008, Casey Anthony was indicted by a grand jury on charges of first degree murder, aggravated child abuse, aggravated manslaughter of a child, and four counts of providing false information to police. She was later arrested, and Judge John Jordan ordered that she be held without bond. On October 21, 2008, the charges of child neglect were dropped against Casey, according to the State Attorney's Office because "[as] the evidence proved that the child was deceased, the State sought an indictment on the legally appropriate charges." On October 28, Anthony was arraigned and pleaded not guilty to all charges.

On April 13, 2009, prosecutors announced that they planned to seek the death penalty in the case.

Trial

Evidence
Four hundred pieces of evidence were presented. A strand of hair was recovered from the trunk of Casey's car which was microscopically similar to hair taken from Caylee's hairbrush. The strand showed "root-banding," in which hair roots form a dark band after death, which was consistent with hair from a dead body.

Kronk, who discovered the remains, repeated the same basic story that he had told police. On Friday, October 24, 2008, a forensic report by Arpad Vass of the Oak Ridge National Laboratory judged that results from an air sampling procedure (called LIBS) performed in the trunk of Casey Anthony's car showed chemical compounds "consistent with a decompositional event" based on the presence of five key chemical compounds out of over 400 possible chemical compounds that Vass's research group considers typical of decomposition. Investigators stated that the trunk smelled strongly of human decomposition, but human decomposition was not specified on the laboratory scale. The process has not been affirmed by a Daubert Test in the courts. Vass's group also stated there was chloroform in the car trunk.

In October 2009, officials released 700 pages of documents related to the Anthony investigation, including records of Google searches of the terms "neck breaking" and "how to make chloroform" on a computer accessible to Casey, presented by the prosecutors as evidence of a crime.

According to detectives, crime-scene evidence included residue of a heart-shaped sticker found on duct tape over the mouth of Caylee's skull. However, the laboratory was not able to capture a heart-shape photographically after some duct tape was subjected to dye testing. A blanket found at the crime scene matched Caylee's bedding at her grandparents' home.

Among photos entered into evidence was one from the computer of Ricardo Morales, an ex-boyfriend of Casey Anthony, depicting a man leaning over a woman with a rag, captioned "Win her over with Chloroform".

Prosecution witness John Dennis Bradley's software, developed for computer investigations, was used by the prosecution to indicate that Casey had conducted extensive computer searches on the word "chloroform" 84 times, and to suggest that Anthony had planned to commit murder. He later discovered that a flaw in the software misread the forensic data and that the word "chloroform" had been searched for only one time and the website in question offered information on the use of chloroform in the 19th century (see ).

Attorneys and jury
The lead prosecutor in the case was Assistant State Attorney Linda Drane Burdick. Assistant State Attorneys Frank George and Jeff Ashton completed the prosecution team. Lead counsel for the defense was Jose Baez, a Florida criminal defense attorney. Attorneys J. Cheney Mason, Dorothy Clay Sims, and Ann Finnell served as co-counsel. During the trial, attorney Mark Lippman represented George and Cindy Anthony.

Jury selection began on May 9, 2011, at the Pinellas County Criminal Justice Center in Clearwater, Florida, because the case had been so widely reported in the Orlando area. Jurors were brought from Pinellas County to Orlando. Jury selection took longer than expected and ended on May 20, 2011, with twelve jurors and five alternates being sworn in. The panel consisted of nine women and eight men. The trial took six weeks, during which time the jury was sequestered to avoid influence from information available outside the courtroom.

Opening statements
The trial began on May 24, 2011, at the Orange County Courthouse, with Judge Belvin Perry presiding. In the opening statements, lead prosecutor Linda Drane Burdick described the story of the disappearance of Caylee Anthony day-by-day. The prosecution alleged an intentional murder and sought the death penalty against Casey Anthony. Prosecutors stated that Anthony used chloroform to render her daughter unconscious before putting duct tape over her nose and mouth to suffocate her, and left Caylee's body in the trunk of her car for a few days before disposing of it. They characterized Anthony as a party girl who killed her daughter to free herself from parental responsibility and enjoy her personal life.

The defense, led by Jose Baez, claimed in opening statements that Caylee drowned accidentally in the family's pool on June 16, 2008, and was found by George Anthony, who told Casey she would spend the rest of her life in jail for child neglect and then proceeded to cover up Caylee's death. Baez argued this is why Casey Anthony went on with her life and failed to report the incident for 31 days. He alleged that it was the habit of a lifetime for Casey to hide her pain and pretend nothing was wrong because she had been sexually abused by George Anthony since she was eight years old and her brother Lee also had made advances toward her. Baez also questioned whether Roy Kronk, the meter reader who found the bones, had actually removed them from another location, and further alleged that the police department's investigation was compromised by their desire to feed a media frenzy about a child's murder, rather than a more mundane drowning. He admitted that Casey had lied about there being a nanny named Zenaida Fernandez-Gonzales.

Witness testimony
Prosecutors called George Anthony as their first witness and, in a response to their question, he denied having sexually abused his daughter Casey. Anthony testified he did not smell anything resembling human decomposition in Casey's car when she visited him on June 24, but he did smell something similar to human decomposition when he picked the car up on July 15. Cindy Anthony testified that her comment to  that Casey's car smelled "like someone died" was just a "figure of speech".

Baez asked an FBI analyst about the paternity test the FBI conducted to see if Lee Anthony, Casey's brother, was Caylee's father. She told the jury the test had come back negative. Regarding a photo on the computer of Ricardo Morales, an ex-boyfriend of Casey Anthony, depicting a poster with the caption "Win her over with Chloroform," Morales said that the photo was on his Myspace page and that he had never discussed chloroform with Anthony or searched for chloroform on her computer.

The prosecution called John Dennis Bradley, a former Canadian law enforcement officer who develops software for computer investigations, to analyze a data file from a desktop taken from the Anthony home. Bradley said he was able to use a program to recover deleted searches from March 17 and March 21, 2008, and that someone searched the website Sci-spot.com for "chloroform" 84 times. Bradley expressed his belief that "some of these items might have been bookmarked". Under cross-examination by the defense, Bradley agreed there were two individual accounts on the desktop and that there was no way to know who actually performed the searches.

Police dog handler Jason Forgey testified that Gerus, a German Shepherd cadaver dog certified in 2005, indicated a high alert of human decomposition in the trunk of Casey's car, saying the police dog has had real-world searches numbering "over three thousand by now". During cross-examination, Baez argued that the dog's search records were "hearsay". Sgt. Kristin Brewer also testified that her police dog, Bones, signaled decomposition in the backyard during a search in July 2008. However, neither police dog was able to detect decomposition during a second visit to the Anthony home. Brewer explained that this was because whatever had been in the yard was either moved or the odor dissipated.

The prosecution called chief medical examiner Jan Garavaglia, who testified that she determined Caylee's manner of death to be homicide, but listed it as "death by undetermined means". Garavaglia took into account the physical evidence present on the remains she examined, as well as all the available information on the way they were found and what she had been told by the authorities, before arriving at her determination. "We know by our observations that it's a red flag when a child has not been reported to authorities with injury, there's foul play," Garavaglia said, and continued "There is no child that should have duct tape on its face when it dies." Additionally, Garavaglia addressed the chloroform evidence found by investigators inside the trunk of Casey's car, testifying that even a small amount of chloroform would be sufficient to cause the death of a child.

University of Florida professor and human identification laboratory director Michael Warren was brought on by the prosecution to present a computer animation of the way duct tape could have been used in the death of the child, which the defense objected to hearing. Judge Perry, after a short recess to review, ruled that the video could be shown to the jury. The animation featured a picture of Caylee taken alongside Casey, superimposed with an image of Caylee's decomposed skull, and another with a strip of duct tape that was recovered with her remains. The images were slowly brought together showing that the duct tape could have covered her nose and mouth. Baez stated, "This disgusting superimposition is nothing more than a fantasy ...They're throwing things against the wall and seeing if it sticks." Jurors were seen taking notes of the imagery, and Warren testified that it was his opinion that the duct tape found with Caylee's skull was placed there before her body began decomposing.

FBI latent-print examiner Elizabeth Fontaine testified that adhesive in the shape of a heart was found on a corner of a piece of duct tape that was covering the mouth portion of Caylee's remains during ultraviolet testing. Fontaine examined three pieces of duct tape found on Caylee's remains for fingerprints, and said she did not find fingerprints but did not expect to, given the months the tape and the remains had been outdoors and exposed to the elements, stressing that any oil or sweat from a person's fingertips would have long since deteriorated. Although Fontaine showed the findings to her supervisor, she did not initially try to photograph the heart-shaped adhesive, explaining, "When I observe something is unexpected, I note it and continue with my examination." During the defense's cross-examination, Fontaine explained that when she examined the sticker evidence a second time, after subjecting the tape to dye testing, "It was no longer visible." She said that other FBI agents had tested the duct tape in the interim.

The defense called two government witnesses who countered prosecution witness testimony about the duct tape. The chief investigator for the medical examiner stated that the original placement of the duct tape was unclear and it could have shifted positions as he collected the remains. Cindy Anthony testified that their family buried their pets in blankets and plastic bags, using duct tape to seal the opening. Additionally, an FBI forensic document examiner found no evidence of a sticker or sticker residue on the duct tape found near the child's remains.

The defense called forensic pathologist Dr. Werner Spitz, who performed a second autopsy on Caylee after Garavaglia and challenged Garavaglia's autopsy report. He called her autopsy "shoddy," saying it was a failure that Caylee's skull was not opened during her examination. "You need to examine the whole body in an autopsy," he said. Spitz stated that he was not allowed to attend Garavaglia's initial autopsy on Caylee's remains, and that, from his own follow-up autopsy, he was not comfortable ruling the child's death a homicide. He said he could not determine what Caylee's manner of death was, but said that there was no indication to him that she was murdered. Additionally, Spitz testified that he believed the duct tape found on Caylee's skull was placed there after the body decomposed, opining that if tape was placed on the skin, there should have been DNA left on it, and suggested that someone may have staged some of the crime scene photos. "The person who took this picture, the person who prepared this, put the hair there," stated Spitz. When asked by Ashton during cross-examination, "So your testimony is the medical examiner's personnel took the hair that wasn't on the skull, placed it there?", Spitz answered, "It wouldn't be the first time, sir. I can tell you some horror stories about that."

On June 21, Bradley discovered that a flaw in his software misread the forensic data and that the word "chloroform" had been searched for only one time and the website in question offered information on the use of chloroform in the 19th century. On June 23, Baez called Cindy Anthony to the stand, who told jurors she had been the one who performed the "chloroform" search on the family computer in March 2008. The prosecution alleged that only Casey could have conducted this search and the others because she was the only one home at the time. When asked by prosecutors how she could have made the Internet searches when employment records show she was at work, Cindy Anthony said despite what her work time sheet indicates, she was at home during these time periods because she left from work early during the days in question. Bradley alerted prosecutor Linda Burdick and Sgt. Kevin Stenger of the Sheriff's Office the weekend of June 25 about the discrepancy in his software, and volunteered to fly to Orlando at his own expense to show them. On the same day, the judge temporarily halted proceedings when the defense filed a motion to determine if Anthony was competent to proceed with trial. The motion states the defense received a privileged communication from their client which caused them to believe that "Ms. Anthony is not competent to aid and assist in her own defense". The trial resumed on June 27 when the judge announced that the results of the psychological evaluations showed Anthony was competent to proceed. In later testimony about air samples, Dr. Ken Furton, a professor of chemistry at Florida International University, stated that there is no consensus in the field on what chemicals are typical of human decomposition. Judge Perry ruled that the jury would not get to smell air samples taken from the trunk.

The prosecution stated they discussed Bradley's software discrepancy with Baez on June 27, and he raised the issue in court testimony. Baez also asked Judge Perry to instruct the jury about this search information, but prosecutors disputed this and it was not done. Also on June 27, the defense called two private investigators who had searched the area in November 2008 where the body was later found. The search was videotaped, but nothing was found. On June 28, the defense called a Texas EquuSearch team leader who did two searches of the area and found no body. The defense then called Roy Kronk, who recounted the same basic story he told police about his discovery of Caylee Anthony's remains in December 2008. He acknowledged receiving $5,000 after the remains were identified, but denied that he told his son that finding the body would make him rich and famous. The next day, his son testified he had made such statements.

On June 30 the defense called Krystal Holloway, a volunteer in the search for Caylee, who stated that she had had an affair with George Anthony, that he had been to her home, and that he had texted her, "Just thinking about you. I need you in my life." She told the defense that George Anthony had told her that Caylee's death was "an accident that snowballed out of control." Under cross-examination by prosecutors, they pointed to her sworn police statement in which she had said that George Anthony believed it was an accident, rather than knowing that it was. In her initial report, Holloway reported George Anthony saying, "I really believe that it was an accident that just went wrong and (Casey Anthony) tried to cover it up." She said he had not told her he was present when the alleged accident occurred. During redirect examination, Baez asked Holloway if George Anthony had told her that Caylee was dead while stating publicly that she was missing, to which she replied yes.

In his earlier testimony George Anthony had denied the affair with Holloway, and said he visited her only because she was ill. He said he sent the text message because he needed everyone who had helped in his life. After Holloway's testimony, Judge Perry told jurors that it could be used to impeach George Anthony's credibility, but that it was not proof of how Caylee died, nor evidence of Casey Anthony's guilt or innocence.

The prosecution rested its case on June 15, after calling 59 witnesses for 70 different testimonies. The defense rested its case on June 30, after calling 47 witnesses for 63 different testimonies. Casey Anthony did not testify.

On June 30 and July 1, the prosecutor presented rebuttal arguments, beginning by showing the jury photographs of Caylee's clothes and George's suicide note. It called two representatives of Cindy Anthony's former employer who explained why their computer login system shows Cindy was at work the afternoon she said she went home early and searched her computer for information about chloroform. A police computer analyst testified someone had purposely searched online for "neck + breaking." Another analyst testified she did not find evidence that Cindy Anthony had searched certain terms she claimed to have searched. Anthropology professor Dr. Michael Warren from the University of Florida was recalled to rebut a defense witness on the need to open a skull during an autopsy. The lead detective stated that there were no phone calls between Cindy and George Anthony during the week of June 16, 2008; however, he told the defense he did not know that George had a second cell phone.

Closing arguments
Closing arguments were heard July 3 and July 4. Jeff Ashton, for the prosecution, told the jury, "When you have a child, that child becomes your life. This case is about the clash between that responsibility, and the expectations that go with it, and the life that Casey Anthony wanted to have." He outlined the state's case against Casey, touching on her many lies to her parents and others, the smell in her car's trunk—identified by several witnesses, including her own father, as the odor from human decomposition—and the items found with Caylee's skeletal remains in December 2008. He emphasized how Casey "maintains her lies until they absolutely cannot be maintained any more" and then replaces [them] with another lie, using "Zanny the Nanny" as an example. Anthony repeatedly told police that Caylee was with the nanny that she specifically identified as Zenaida Fernandez-Gonzalez. Police, however, were never able to find the nanny. Authorities did find a woman named Zenaida Fernandez-Gonzalez, but she denied ever meeting the Anthonys.

Ashton reintroduced the items found with Caylee's remains, including a Winnie the Pooh blanket that matched the bedding at her grandparents' home, one of a set of laundry bags with the twin bag found at the Anthony home, and duct tape he said was a relatively rare brand. "That bag is Caylee's coffin," Ashton said, holding up a photograph of the laundry bag, as Casey reacted with emotion. He further criticized the defense's theory that Caylee drowned in the Anthony pool and that Casey and George panicked upon finding the child's body and covered up her death. He advised jurors to use their common sense when deciding on a verdict. "No one makes an accident look like murder," he said.

Before closing arguments, Judge Perry ruled that the defense could argue that a drowning occurred due to reasonable conclusions aided by witness testimony, but that arguing sexual abuse was not allowed since there was nothing to support the claim that George sexually abused Casey. Baez began by contending that there were holes in the prosecution's forensic evidence, saying it was based on a "fantasy". He told the jury that the prosecution wanted them to see stains and insects that did not really exist, that they had not proven that the stains in Anthony's car trunk were caused by Caylee's decomposing body, rather than from a trash bag found there. He added that the prosecutors tried to make his client look like a promiscuous liar because their evidence was weak. He said the drowning is "the only explanation that makes sense" and showed jurors a photograph of Caylee opening the home's sliding glass door by herself. He stressed that there were no child safety locks in the home and that both of Casey's parents, George and Cindy, testified that Caylee could get out of the house easily. Although Cindy testified that Caylee could not put the ladder on the side of the pool and climb up, Baez alleged that Cindy may have left the ladder up the night before. "She didn't admit to doing so in testimony," he said, "but how much guilt would she have knowing it was her that left the ladder up that day?"

Defense attorney Jose Baez told jurors his biggest fear was that they would base their verdict on emotions, not evidence. "The strategy behind that is, if you hate her, if you think she's a lying, no-good slut, then you'll start to look at this evidence in a different light," he said. "I told you at the very beginning of this case that this was an accident that snowballed out of control... What made it unique is not what happened, but who it happened to." He explained Casey Anthony's behavior as being the result of her dysfunctional family situation. At one point as Baez spoke, Ashton could be seen smiling or chuckling behind his hand. This prompted Baez to refer to him as "this laughing guy right here". The judge called a sidebar conference, then a recess. When court resumed, he chastised both sides, saying both Ashton and Baez had violated his order that neither side should make disparaging remarks about opposing counsel. After both attorneys apologized, the judge accepted the apologies but warned that a recurrence would have the offending attorney excluded from the courtroom.

Defense attorney Cheney Mason then followed with an additional closing argument, addressing the jury to discuss the charges against Casey Anthony. "The burden rests on the shoulders of my colleagues at the state attorney's office," Mason said, referring to proving that Casey Anthony committed a crime. Mason said that the jurors are required, whether they like it or not, to find the defendant not guilty if the state did not adequately prove its case against Casey Anthony. Mason emphasized that the burden of proof is on the state, and that Casey Anthony's decision not to testify is not an implication of guilt.

Lead prosecutor Linda Drane Burdick in the prosecution rebuttal told the jurors that she and her colleagues backed up every claim they made in their opening statement six weeks ago, and implied that the defense never directly backed up their own opening-statement claims. "My biggest fear is that common sense will be lost in all the rhetoric of the case," she said, insisting that she would never ask the jury to make their decision based on emotion but rather the evidence. "Responses to guilt are oh, so predictable," she stated. "What do guilty people do? They lie, they avoid, they run, they mislead... they divert attention away from themselves and they act like nothing is wrong." She suggested that the garbage bag in the trunk of the car was a "decoy" put there to keep people from getting suspicious about the smell of the car when she left it abandoned in a parking stall directly beside a dumpster in an Amscot parking lot. "Whose life was better without Caylee?" she asked, stressing how George and Cindy Anthony were wondering where their daughter and granddaughter were in June and July 2008, the same time Casey was staying at her boyfriend's apartment while Caylee's body was decomposing in the woods. "That's the only question you need to answer in considering why Caylee Marie Anthony was left on the side of the road dead." Burdick then showed the jury a split-screen with a photo of Casey partying at a night club on one side and a close-up of the "" (meaning "Beautiful Life") tattoo that she got weeks after Caylee died on the other.

The jury began deliberations on July 4. On July 5, prosecutors stated that, during deliberations, they were about to give the jury the corrected information with regard to Bradley's software discrepancy; however, the jury reached a verdict before they could do so. One legal analyst stated that if the jury had found Casey guilty before receiving the exculpatory evidence, the prosecution's failure to fully disclose it could have been grounds for a mistrial.

Verdict and sentence
On July 5, 2011, the jury found Casey not guilty of counts one through three regarding first-degree murder, aggravated manslaughter of a child, and aggravated child abuse, while finding her guilty on counts four through seven for providing false information to law enforcement:
 Count Four: Anthony said she was employed at Universal Studios during 2008, pursuant to the investigation of a missing persons report.
 Count Five: Anthony said she had left Caylee at an apartment complex with a babysitter causing law enforcement to pursue the missing babysitter.
 Count Six: Anthony said she informed two "employees" of Universal Studios, Jeff Hopkins and Juliet Lewis, at Universal, of the disappearance of Caylee.
 Count Seven: Anthony said she had received a phone call and spoke to Caylee on July 15, 2008, causing law enforcement to expend further resources.

On July 7, 2011, sentencing arguments were heard. The defense asked for the sentencing to be based on one count of lying on the grounds that the offenses occurred as part of a single interview with police dealing with the same matter, the disappearance of her daughter, as one continuous lie. The defense also argued for concurrent sentences, that is for all four counts to become one count and the sentence to run together as one. The judge disagreed with defense arguments, finding that Anthony's statements consisted of "four distinct, separate lies" ordered the sentences be served consecutively, noting that "Law enforcement expended a great deal of time, energy and manpower looking for Caylee Marie Anthony. This search went on from July through December, over several months, trying to find Caylee Marie Anthony." Judge Perry sentenced Casey to one year in the county jail and $1,000 in fines for each of the four counts of providing false information to a law enforcement officer, the maximum penalty prescribed by law. She received 1,043 days credit for time served plus additional credit for good behavior, resulting in her release on July 17, 2011.

In September 2011, Perry, complying with a Florida statute requiring judges to assess investigative and prosecution costs if requested by a state agency, ruled that Casey Anthony must pay $217,000 to the state of Florida. He ruled she had to pay those costs directly related to lying to law enforcement about the death of Caylee, including search costs only up to September 30, 2008, when the Sheriff's Office stopped investigating a missing-child case. In earlier arguments, Mason had called the prosecutors' attempts to exact the larger sum "sour grapes" because the prosecution lost its case. He told reporters that Anthony is indigent.

In January 2013, a Florida appellate court reduced her convictions from four to two counts. Her attorney had argued that her false statements constituted a single offense; however, the court noted she gave false information during two separate police interviews several hours apart.

Media coverage

Initial coverage
The case attracted a significant amount of national media attention, and was regularly the main topic of many TV talk shows; including those hosted by Greta Van Susteren, Nancy Grace and Geraldo Rivera. It has been featured on Fox's America's Most Wanted, NBC's Dateline, and ABC's 20/20. Nancy Grace referred to Casey Anthony as the "tot mom", and urged the public to let "the professionals, the psychics and police" do their jobs.

Casey Anthony's parents, Cindy and George, appeared on The Today Show on October 22, 2008. They maintained their belief that Caylee was alive and would be found. Larry Garrison, president of SilverCreek Entertainment, was their spokesman until November 2008, citing that he was resigning as spokesperson due to "the Anthony family's erratic behavior".

More than 6,000 pages of evidence released by the Orange County Sheriff's Department, including hundreds of instant messages between Casey and her ex-boyfriend Tony Rusciano, were the subject of increased scrutiny by the media for clues and possible motives in the homicide. Outside the Anthony home, WESH TV 2 reported that protesters repeatedly shouted "baby killer" and that George Anthony was physically attacked. George Anthony was reported missing on January 22, 2009, after he failed to show up for a meeting with his lawyer, Brad Conway. George was found in a Daytona Beach hotel the next day after sending messages to family members threatening suicide. He was taken to Halifax Hospital for psychiatric evaluation and later released.

Trial coverage
The trial was commonly compared to the O. J. Simpson murder case, both for its widespread media attention and initial shock at the not-guilty verdict. At the start of the trial, dozens of people raced to the Orange County Courthouse, hoping to secure one of 50 seats open to the public at the murder trial. Because the case received such thorough media attention in Orlando, jurors were brought in from Pinellas County, Florida, and sequestered for the entire trial. The trial became a "macabre tourist attraction", as people camped outside for seats in the courtroom, where scuffles also broke out among those wanting seats inside. The New York Post described the trial as going "from being a newsworthy case to one of the biggest ratings draws in recent memory", and Time magazine dubbed it "the social media trial of the century". Cable news channels and network news programs became intent upon covering the case as extensively as they could. Scot Safon, executive vice president of HLN, said it was "not about policy" but rather the "very, very strong human dimension" of the case that drove the network to cover it. The audience for HLN's Nancy Grace rose more than 150 percent, and other news channels deciding to focus on the trial saw their ratings double and triple. HLN achieved its most watched hour in network history (4.575 million) and peaked at 5.205 million when the verdict was read. According to The Christian Post, the O. J. Simpson case had a 91 percent television viewing audience, with 142 million people listening by radio and watching television as the verdict was delivered. "The Simpson case was the longest trial ever held in California, costing more than $20 million to fight and defend, running up 50,000 pages of trial transcript in the process." The Casey Anthony trial was expected to "far exceed" these numbers.

Opinions varied on what made the public thoroughly invested in the trial. Safon argued the Anthonys having been a regular and "unremarkable" family with complex relationships made them intriguing to watch. In a special piece for CNN, psychologist Frank Farley described the circumstantial evidence as "all over the map" and that combined with "the apparent lying, significant contradictions and flip-flops of testimony, and questionable or bizarre theories of human behavior, it is little wonder that this nation [was] glued to the tube". He said it was a trial that was both a psychologist's dream and nightmare, and believes that much of the public's fascination had to do with the uncertainty of a motive for the crime. Psychologist Karyl McBride discussed how some mothers stray away from "the saintly archetype" expected of mothers. "We want so badly to hang onto the belief system that mothers don't harm children," she stated. "It's fascinating that the defense in the Anthony case found a way to blame the father. While we don't know what is true and maybe never will, it is worth taking a look at the narcissistic family when maternal narcissism rules the roost. Casey Anthony is a beautiful white woman and the fact that the case includes such things as sex, lies, and videotapes makes it irresistible."

When the not-guilty verdict was rendered, there was significant outcry among the general public and media that the jury made the wrong decision. Outside the courthouse, many in the crowd of 500 reacted with anger, chanting their disapproval and waving protest signs. People took to Facebook and Twitter, as well as other social media outlets, to express their outrage. Traffic to news sites surged from about two million page views a minute to 3.3 million, with most of the visits coming from the United States. Mashable reported that between 2 pm and 3 pm, one million viewers were watching CNN.com/live, 30 times higher than the previous month's average. Twitter's trending topics in the United States were mostly about the subjects related to the case, and Newser reported that posts on Facebook were coming in "too fast for all Facebook to even count them, meaning at least 10 per second". Some people referred to the verdict as "O.J. Number 2", and various media personalities and celebrities expressed outrage via Twitter. News anchor Julie Chen became visibly upset while reading the not-guilty verdict on The Talk and had to be assisted by her fellow co-hosts, who also expressed their dismay.

Others, such as Sean Hannity of the Fox News Channel, felt the verdict was fair because the prosecution did not have enough evidence to establish guilt or meet its burden of proof beyond a reasonable doubt. Hannity said that the verdict was legally correct, and that all of the evidence that was presented by the prosecution was either impeached or contradicted by the defense. John Cloud of Time magazine echoed these sentiments, saying the jury made the right call: "Anthony got off because the prosecution couldn't answer [the questions]," Cloud stated. "Because the prosecutors had so little physical evidence, they built their case on Anthony's (nearly imperceptible) moral character. The prosecutors seemed to think that if jurors saw what a fantastic liar Anthony was, they would understand that she could also be a murderer."

Disagreement with the verdict was heavily debated by the media, lawyers and psychologists, who put forth several theories for public dissatisfaction with the decision, ranging from wanting justice for Caylee, to the circumstantial evidence having been strong enough, to some blaming the media. UCLA forensic psychiatrist Dr. Carole Lieberman, said, "The main reason that people are reacting so strongly is that the media convicted Casey before the jury decided on the verdict. The public has been whipped up into this frenzy wanting revenge for this poor little adorable child. And because of the desire for revenge, they've been whipped up into a lynch mob." She added, "Nobody likes a liar, and Anthony was a habitual liar. And nobody liked the fact that she was partying after Caylee's death. Casey obviously has a lot of psychological problems. Whether she murdered her daughter or not is another thing."

There was a gender gap in perceptions to the case. According to a USA Today/Gallup Poll of 1,010 respondents, about two-thirds of Americans (64 percent) believed Casey Anthony "definitely" or "probably" murdered her daughter; however, women were much more likely than men to believe the murder charges against Anthony and to be upset by the not-guilty verdict. The poll reported that women were more than twice as likely as men, 28 percent versus 11 percent, to think Anthony "definitely" committed murder. Twenty-seven percent of women said they were angry about the verdict, compared with nine percent of men. On the day Casey Anthony was sentenced for lying to investigators in the death of her daughter, supporters and protesters gathered outside the Orange County Courthouse, with one man who displayed a sign asking Anthony to marry him. Two men who drove overnight from West Virginia held signs that said, "We love and support you Casey Anthony," and "Nancy Grace, stop trying to ruin innocent lives. The jury has spoken. P.S. Our legal system still works!" The gender gap has partly been explained by "the maternal instinct"—the idea of a mother murdering her own child is a threat to the ideal of motherhood. For example, the trial was compared to the 1960s trial of Alice Crimmins, who was accused of murdering her two small children.

Explanations other than, or emphasizing, the prosecution's lack of forensic evidence were given for the jury's decision. A number of media commentators reasoned that the prosecution overcharged the case by tagging on the death penalty, concluding that people in good conscience could not sentence Anthony to death based on the circumstantial evidence presented. The CSI effect was also extensively argued—that society now lives "in a 'CSI age' where everyone expects fingerprints and DNA, and we are sending a message that old-fashioned circumstantial evidence is not sufficient". Likewise, commentators such as O. J. Simpson case prosecutor Marcia Clark believe that the jury interpreted "reasonable doubt" too narrowly. Clark said instruction on reasonable doubt is "the hardest, most elusive" instruction of all. "And I think it's where even the most fair-minded jurors can get derailed," she said, opining the confusion between reasonable doubt and a reason to doubt. "In Scotland, they have three verdicts: guilty, not guilty, and not proven. It's one way of showing that even if the jury didn't believe the evidence amounted to proof beyond a reasonable doubt, it didn't find the defendant innocent either. There's a difference."

Aftermath

Defense, prosecution, and jury
Following the criminal trial, Mason blamed the media for the passionate hatred directed toward Casey Anthony. He described it as a "media assassination" of her before and during the trial, saying, "I hope that this is a lesson to those of you who have indulged in media assassination for three years, bias, and prejudice, and incompetent talking heads saying what would be and how to be." Mason added: "I can tell you that my colleagues from coast to coast and border to border have condemned this whole process of lawyers getting on television and talking about cases that they don't know a damn thing about, and don't have the experience to back up their words or the law to do it. Now you have learned a lesson."

Mason's response was viewed as especially critical of Nancy Grace, whose news program is cited as having "almost single-handedly inflated the Anthony case from a routine local murder into a national obsession". Grace said that she did not understand why Mason would care what pundits are saying, and that she imagines she has tried and covered as many cases as Mason. She criticized the defense attorneys for delivering media criticism before mentioning Caylee's name in their post-verdict news conference, and said she disagrees with the verdict. At a meeting of local professionals, named the Tiger Bay Club of Tampa, Mason told the media and those in attendance that he was surprised by the not-guilty verdict.

State's Attorney Lawson Lamar said, "We're disappointed in the verdict today because we know the facts and we've put in absolutely every piece of evidence that existed. This is a dry-bones case. Very, very difficult to prove. The delay in recovering little Caylee's remains worked to our considerable disadvantage." Jose Baez said, "While we're happy for Casey, there are no winners in this case. Caylee has passed on far, far too soon, and what my driving force has been for the last three years has been always to make sure that there has been justice for Caylee and Casey because Casey did not murder Caylee. It's that simple." He added, "And today our system of justice has not dishonored her memory by a false conviction." Former Casey Anthony defense attorney Linda Kenney Baden shared Baez's sentiments. She believes the jury reached the right verdict. "We should embrace their verdict," she stated.

On July 6, 2011, Jeff Ashton gave his first interview about the case on The View. Ashton said of the verdict, "Obviously, it's not the outcome we wanted. But from the perspective of what we do, this was a fantastic case." He disagrees with those who state the prosecution overcharged the case, saying, "The facts that we had... this was first-degree murder. I think it all came down to the evidence. I think ultimately it came down to the cause of death." Ashton additionally explained that if the jury did not perceive first-degree murder when they saw the photograph of Caylee's skull with the duct tape, "then so be it". He said he accepts the jury's decision and that it has not taken away his faith in the justice system. "You can't believe in the rule of law and not accept that sometimes it doesn't go the way you think it should," stated Ashton, and explained that he understands why the case "struck such a nerve" with the public. He added that "I think when people see someone that they believe has so gone away from [a mother's love for her child], it just outrages them." Ashton also made appearances on several other talk shows in the days following, and complimented Jose Baez on his cross-examinations and as having "the potential to be a great attorney".

After the trial ended, the twelve jurors did not initially want to discuss the verdict with the media. Fifty-one-year-old Russell Huekler, an alternate juror who stepped forward the day of the verdict, said, "The prosecution didn't provide the evidence that was there for any of the charges from first-degree murder down to second-degree murder to the child abuse to even the manslaughter [charge]. It just wasn't there."

The next day, juror number three—Jennifer Ford, a 32-year-old nursing student—told ABC News, "I did not say she was innocent" and "I just said there was not enough evidence. If you cannot prove what the crime was, you cannot determine what the punishment should be." She added, "I'm not saying that I believe the defense," but that "it's easier for me logically to get from point A to point B" via the defense argument, as opposed to the prosecution argument. Ford believed George Anthony was "dishonest." She said the jury "was sick to [their] stomachs to get [the not-guilty] verdict" and that the decision process overwhelmed them to the point where they did not want to talk to reporters afterwards. Juror number two, a 46-year-old male who requested to stay unidentified, told the St. Petersburg Times that "everybody agreed if we were going fully on feelings and emotions, [Anthony] was done". He stated that a lack of evidence was the reason for the not-guilty verdict: "I just swear to God ... I wish we had more evidence to put her away. I truly do ... But it wasn't there." He also said that Anthony was "not a good person in my opinion".

In an anonymous interview, the jury foreman stated, "When I had to sign off on the verdict, the sheet that was given to me—there was just a feeling of disgust that came over me knowing that my signature and [Casey Anthony's] signature were going to be on the same sheet," but that "there was a suspicion of [George Anthony]" that played a part in the jury's deliberations. The foreman stated his work experience enabled him to read people and that George Anthony "had a very selective memory" which stayed with the jurors, emphasizing that the jury was frustrated by the motive, cause of death, and George Anthony. "That a mother would want to do something like that to her child just because she wanted to go out and party," he said. "We felt that the motive that the state provided was, in our eyes, was just kind of weak." Although the foreman objected to Casey Anthony's behavior in the wake of her daughter's death, he and the jury did not factor that behavior into their verdict because it was not illegal. They initially took a vote on the murder count, which was 10–2 (two voting guilty), but after more than ten hours of deliberation, they decided the only charges they felt were proven were the four counts of lying to law enforcement.

Perry announced at sentencing on July 7 that he would withhold the jurors' names for several months because of concern that "Some people would like to take something out on them." He released the jurors' names on October 25, 2011. On May 6, 2013, he stated that he believed there was sufficient evidence to convict Casey Anthony, even though most of the evidence was circumstantial, and that he was shocked by the not-guilty verdict.

Anthony family
Mark Lippman, the attorney for George and Cindy Anthony, told ABC News that the family received death threats after the not-guilty verdict was rendered. In response to the verdict, a statement was released by Lippman on behalf of the Anthony family (George, Cindy and Lee Anthony):
While the family may never know what has happened to Caylee Marie Anthony, they now have closure for this chapter of their life. They will now begin the long process of rebuilding their lives. Despite the baseless defense chosen by Casey Anthony, the family believes that the Jury made a fair decision based on the evidence presented, the testimony presented, the scientific information presented and the rules that were given to them by the Honorable Judge Perry to guide them. The family hopes that they will be given the time by the media to reflect on this verdict and decide the best way to move forward privately.

It was alleged in press reports that Cindy Anthony had perjured herself when telling jurors she—not Casey Anthony—was the one who used her family computer to search the Internet for "chloroform". The state attorney's office said she would not be charged.

On July 6, 2011, Anthony's jailhouse letters were released to the general public. They were originally released (though not to public) in April 2010 by prosecutors preparing for the Anthony trial. In more than 250 handwritten pages, Anthony discusses her life in jail, what she misses, and her plans for the future if freed. On July 8, 2011, Cindy Anthony had scheduled a visit to meet with Casey at 7:00 p.m., but Casey declined to meet with her mother. Mark Lippman told Reuters during the trial that Casey had cut off communication with her parents. It was later announced that George and Cindy Anthony would be appearing on Dr. Phil in September 2011 to tell their story.

Casey left for an undisclosed location not long after the verdict. However, on August 12, she was ordered to return to Florida to serve a year's supervised probation for an unrelated check-fraud conviction. When she pleaded guilty to that charge in January 2010, the judge in that case intended for Casey to serve her probation after proceedings in the murder case concluded, but an error in the sentencing documents allowed her to serve her probation while awaiting trial. Casey returned to Florida on August 25 and served out her probation in an undisclosed location. Due to numerous threats against her life, the Department of Corrections did not enter her information into the state parolee database. In August 2011, George and Cindy issued a statement that Casey would not be living at their home when she returned to Florida to serve her probation. According to Huffington Post, she was reportedly working with her probation officer to take online college classes in an unspecified field, while protected by her security, at an undisclosed educational institution.

In August 2011, the Florida Department of Children and Families released a report based on a three-year investigation into the disappearance and death of Caylee. An agency spokesperson stated, "It is the conclusion of the [DCF] that [Casey Anthony] failed to protect her child from harm either through her actions or lack of actions, which tragically resulted in the child's untimely death."

Casey filed for bankruptcy with the Middle District of Florida Bankruptcy Court on January 27, 2013. Her estimated liabilities were between $500,000 and $1 million.

Civil suits
In September 2008, a Zenaida Gonzalez sued Casey for defamation. During the investigation, Anthony told investigators that she left -year-old Caylee with a babysitter named Zenaida Fernandez-Gonzalez—also known as "Zanny"—on June 16 at the stairs of a specific apartment in the Sawgrass apartment complex located in Orlando. Zenaida Gonzalez, who was listed on apartment records as having visited apartments on that date, was questioned by police, but stated she did not know Casey or Caylee. Her defamation suit sought compensatory and punitive damages, alleging that Casey willfully damaged her reputation. Gonzalez told reporters that she lost her job, was evicted from her house, and received death threats against herself and her children as a result of Anthony's lies. Gonzalez' lawyer, John Morgan, said he wanted to interrogate Anthony about Caylee's death because it was "the essence" of the defamation suit.

On October 8, 2011, Morgan deposed Casey via a video conference. She exercised her Fifth Amendment right against self-incrimination and answered only a couple of factual questions. Morgan felt that was improper, but legal experts thought that Anthony was well within her rights to plead the Fifth until her appeals of the convictions for lying to officers had been exhausted. Gonzalez' attorneys sought and received permission to obtain Anthony's address (though it was kept sealed from the public) so they could subpoena her to testify, even if she only took the stand long enough to plead the Fifth. However, Gonzalez had been willing to drop the suit if Anthony were to apologize to her and compensate her for pain and suffering. In September 2015, a judge ruled in favor of Anthony, stating: "There is nothing in the statement…to support (Gonzalez') allegations that (Anthony) intended to portray (the nanny) as a child kidnapper and potentially a child killer."

In July 2011, Texas EquuSearch (TES), a non-profit group which assisted in the search for Caylee from July to December 2008 when she was believed to be missing, sued Anthony for fraud and unjust enrichment. TES estimates that it spent more than $100,000 searching for Caylee even though she was already dead. TES founder and director Tim Miller estimates that the abortive search for Caylee expended 40% of the group's yearly resources which could have been spent looking for other missing children. It only learned that Anthony knew all along that Caylee was dead when the trial began. TES and Anthony eventually settled out of court on October 18, 2013. TES was listed as a creditor to Anthony and was entitled to $75,000.

"Caylee's Law"

Since the end of the trial, various movements have arisen for the creation of a new law, called Caylee's Law, that would impose stricter requirements on parents to notify law enforcement of the death or disappearance of a child. One such petition, circulated via Change.org, has gained nearly 1.3 million electronic signatures. In response to this and other petitions, lawmakers in four states—Florida, Oklahoma, New York, and West Virginia—have begun drafting versions of Caylee's Law. The law in Oklahoma would require a child's parent or guardian to notify police of a missing child within 24 hours, and would also stipulate a time frame for notification of the disappearance of a young child under the age of 12. The Florida law would make it a felony if a parent or legal guardian fails to report a missing child in timely manner if they could have known the child would be in danger. The call for mandatory reporting laws has been criticized as being "reactive, overly indiscriminating and even counterproductive". One critic noted the law could lead to overcompliance and false reports by parents wary of becoming suspects, wasting police resources and leading to legitimate abductions going uninvestigated during the critical first few hours. Additionally, innocent people could get snared in the law for searching for a child instead of immediately calling police.

Memorials and tribute songs
Different artists have written songs in Caylee's memory. Jon Whynock performed his own version at her memorial service in February 2009, and Rascal Flatts' Gary LeVox collaborated with country comedian and radio host Cledus T. Judd and songwriter Jimmy Yeary to write a song titled "She's Going Places" in Caylee's memory.

Later information
In November 2012, WKMG-TV television in Orlando reported that police never investigated Firefox browser evidence on Casey's computer the day of Caylee's death; they only looked at Internet Explorer evidence. The browser history showed that someone at the Anthony household, using a password-protected account Casey used, used Firefox to do a Google search for "foolproof suffocation" at 2:51 p.m., and then clicked on an article criticizing pro-suicide websites promoting "foolproof" ways to die, including the idea of committing suicide by taking poison and putting a plastic bag over one's head. The browser then recorded activity on MySpace, a site used by Casey but not George. The station learned about this information from Casey's attorney Jose Baez who mentioned it in his book on the case, speculating that George had contemplated suicide after Caylee's death. He conceded to reporters that the records are open to interpretation; however, he speculated that the state may have chosen not to introduce the search at trial because, according to Baez, the computer records tend to refute the timeline stated by George, which was that Casey left at 12:50 p.m. An analysis by John Goetz, a retired engineer and computer expert in Connecticut, revealed that her password-protected computer account shows activity on the home computer at 1:39 p.m., with activity on her AIM account, as well as MySpace and Facebook.

In April 2016, transcripts of two 2015 affidavits of private investigator Dominic Casey were filed on the court docket in the matter of Kronk v. Anthony and picked up by news services in May 2016. In one affidavit, Dominic Casey stated that on July 26, 2008, Baez admitted to him that Casey Anthony murdered Caylee Anthony "and dumped the body somewhere and, he needed all the help he could get to find the body before anyone else did". He also claimed that Baez had a sexual relationship with Anthony, and that "Casey told me she had to do what Jose said because she had no money for her defense." Baez "vehemently" denied a sexual relationship.

In March 2017, Casey Anthony gave an interview with the Associated Press. In the interview, she admits to lying to police. When asked about the drowning defense, Anthony stated, "Everyone has their theories, I don't know. As I stand here today, I can't tell you one way or another. The last time I saw my daughter, I believed she was alive and was going to be OK, and that's what was told to me."

In January 2020, Kronk lost an appeal of his defamation case against Anthony and her attorneys. A US District Court judge upheld a lower court finding that there was not enough evidence to prove she willfully defamed Kronk.

On November 29, 2022, a docuseries was released on Peacock, directed by Alexandra Dean, titled Casey Anthony: Where the Truth Lies. In an interview with USA Today, Dean said that Anthony's pathological lying was a defense mechanism caused by her experience of alleged sexual abuse, and that police never looked at her father as a suspect in the disappearance of Caylee.

See also

 List of solved missing person cases
 List of unsolved deaths
 Media circus
 Murder of Lorenzo González Cacho, unsolved murder of an 8-year-old Puerto Rican child, in which his mother figured as a suspect
 Murder of Travis Alexander, a case compared to that of Anthony, with apparent similarities in coverage and the alleged perpetrators.
 Trial by media
 Unreported missing

References

External links

 Central Florida News 13 resources:
 Timeline of complete case
 Link to daily news stories about the trial
 List of all witnesses called
 List of various legal documents, including documentary evidence released by the state from 2009
 Miscellaneous documentary evidence released by the state from 2008, Discovery Channel
 Casey Anthony news coverage, from WFTV-TV (ABC 9) in Orlando, FL
 Casey Anthony news coverage, from WKMG-TV (CBS 6) in Orlando, FL
 Casey Anthony news coverage, from WESH-TV (NBC 2) in Orlando, FL
 Casey Anthony news coverage, from WOFL-TV (FOX 35) in Orlando, FL
 JCS – Criminal Psychology – There's Something About Casey...

2000s missing person cases
2008 in Florida
2011 in Florida
21st century in Orlando, Florida
Child deaths
Criminal trials that ended in acquittal
Deaths by person in Florida
Formerly missing people
June 2008 events in the United States
Missing person cases in Florida
21st-century American trials
Unsolved deaths in the United States
Women in Florida